Gennaro Tutino (born 20 August 1996) is an Italian professional footballer who plays as a forward for  club Palermo, on loan from Parma.

A quick and creative right footed player, with good dribbling skills and an eye for goal, Tutino is capable of playing as either a left or right winger or as a secondary striker but excels at playing on the right wing.

Club career
Tutino began his career in the Napoli youth system, and became the captain of Primavera side, with which he reached the 2013 Coppa Italia Primavera Final, only to lose out to rivals Juventus. He was promoted to the Napoli first team in 2012, although he did not appear with the squad.

On 22 July 2014, he signed with Vicenza on loan from Napoli for the 2014–15 season. However, after a negative spell in Vicenza, due to being ruled out for five months with an injury to the anterior cruciate ligament of his right knee, on 26 January 2015, he was sent on loan once again to Gubbio for the second half of the 2014–15 season.

On 15 July 2015, both Tutino and his young Napoli attacking teammate Roberto Insigne were sent on loan to Avellino with an option to buy.

On 28 January 2016, Tutino and his young Napoli teammate Jacopo Dezi were sent on loan to Bari with an option to buy for the second half of the 2015–16 season.

On 30 July 2016, he was sent on loan from Napoli to Carrarese for the 2016–17 season, along with fellow striker Simone Del Nero, who arrived from Massese.

On 21 July 2018, Tutino joined to Serie B side Carpi on loan until 30 June 2019. On 3 August 2018 the loan was terminated and Tutino was permitted to return to Cosenza on loan, citing family reasons.

On 9 August 2019, Tutino joined Serie A club Hellas Verona on loan until 30 June 2020.

On 10 January 2020 he moved to Empoli on loan.

On 13 August 2021, Tutino joined Parma on a season-long loan with an obligation to buy.

On 18 January 2023, Palermo announced the signing of Tutino from Parma, on a loan deal with an option to buy.

International career
Gennaro Tutino has played for the Italian national U-16 team, Italian national U-17 team and the Italian national U18 team.

Personal life
Gennaro Tutino is the Cousin of Cosenza player Armando Anastasio.

References

External links
 
 
 Gennaro Tutino at FIGC

1996 births
Living people
Italian footballers
Italy youth international footballers
Association football forwards
S.S.C. Napoli players
A.S. Gubbio 1910 players
U.S. Avellino 1912 players
S.S.C. Bari players
Carrarese Calcio players
Cosenza Calcio players
Hellas Verona F.C. players
U.S. Salernitana 1919 players
Parma Calcio 1913 players
Palermo F.C. players
Serie A players
Serie B players
Serie C players
Footballers from Naples